Pechão is a Portuguese parish in the municipality of Olhão. The population in 2011 was 3,601, in an area of 19.79 km².

References

External links
Official website 

Freguesias of Olhão